Graham Paul Cox (born 30 April 1959) is an English retired football who played as a goalkeeper in the Football League for Brentford and Aldershot.

Career

Brentford 
A goalkeeper, Cox joined Brentford as an apprentice during the 1975–76 pre-season. He made his debut in a 3–1 Fourth Division defeat to AFC Bournemouth on 1 January 1977. He also played in the following matches against Colchester United and Crewe Alexandra and conceded seven goals. With the team leaking goals, Crystal Palace keeper Tony Burns was brought in on loan, which ended Cox's involvement in the first team in the 1976–77 season. Cox signed his first professional contract in April 1977, but his final competitive appearance for the Bees came on 26 September 1977 in a 1–1 draw with Stockport County and he departed the club at the end of the 1978–79 season.

Margate (loan) 
Cox joined Southern League Premier Division strugglers Margate on loan in September 1978 and made one appearance as cover for regular goalkeeper Steve Bowtell.

Non-League football 
After his release from Brentford in 1979, Cox dropped into non-League football and played for Wokingham Town, Addlestone & Weybridge Town, Hillingdon Borough and South Ascot.

Aldershot 
Cox made a return to the Football League with Aldershot in January 1985 and made 16 Fourth Division appearances before his departure in 1986.

Slough Town (loan and permanent signing) 
Cox joined Isthmian League Premier Division club Slough Town on loan in October 1985 and made 12 appearances before suffering a double arm fracture and a broken collarbone in a league match versus Sutton United on 23 November. After recovering, he joined the Rebels permanently in April 1986 and made the last of a further 22 appearances in November that year. He stayed on at the club and became assistant manager.

Personal life 
In the 1990s, Cox worked in Bracknell with former Aldershot teammate Tommy Langley, as a photocopier and fax machine salesman.

Career statistics

References

1959 births
Living people
Footballers from Willesden
English footballers
Brentford F.C. players
English Football League players
Margate F.C. players
Wokingham Town F.C. players
Addlestone & Weybridge Town F.C. players
Hillingdon Borough F.C. players
Aldershot F.C. players
Slough Town F.C. players
Southern Football League players
Isthmian League players
Association football goalkeepers